Robin Lesh (22 August 1939 – 5 September 2022) was an Australian tennis player.

Lesh, a Melbourne based player, made her first European tour in 1963 and had a win over a young Virginia Wade en route to the final of the Cumberland tournament. A two-time Wimbledon doubles quarter-finalist, she also made the fourth round of the singles in 1965, then lost to Billie Jean Moffitt. Her tournament wins include the singles title at Aix-en-Provence in 1965. She married Geelong Grammar teacher John Bedggood.

References

1939 births
2022 deaths
Australian female tennis players
Tennis players from Melbourne